The Dominican Republic Professional Baseball League ( or LIDOM) is a professional baseball winter league consisting of six teams spread across the Dominican Republic; it is the highest level of professional baseball played in the Dominican Republic. The league's players include many prospects that go on to play Major League Baseball in the United States while also signing many current MLB veterans. The champion of LIDOM advances to play in the yearly Caribbean Series.

Each team plays a fifty-game round-robin schedule that begins in mid October and runs to the end of December. The top four teams engage in another round-robin schedule with 18 games per team from the end of December to the end of January; the top two teams in those standings then play a best-of-nine series for the national title. The league's champion advances to the Caribbean Series to play against the representatives from Mexico, Venezuela, Colombia, Panama and Puerto Rico.

Current teams

Former teams
Azucareros del Este, 1983–2008, a former name of the current Toros del Este
Caimanes del Sur (San Cristóbal), during 1983–1989
Delfines del Atlántico (Puerto Plata), this team was never officially in the league and did not play
Pollos del Cibao / Pollos Nacionales / Pollos Béisbol Club (San Francisco de Macorís) during 1999–2002, previously Gigantes del Nordeste, currently Gigantes del Cibao

History
For his close involvement in the Dominican league's establishment and early development, Pedro Miguel Caratini has been called "the father of Dominican baseball".

During the years 1930-1963, military dictator General Rafael Trujillo can be credited with furthering the sport of baseball in Dominican Republic. Trujillo encouraged many sugar refineries to create teams of cane cutting laborers to play baseball during the idle months of cultivation. Fostering high levels of competition, the organization structure continued to mature stimulating growth in the intensity and popularity of the game.

In 1937, teams of the Dominican Republic signed a large number of players from the Negro leagues of the United States. These players were given large salaries by Dominican men with money and political power. Among these players were baseball stars James Thomas "Cool Papa" Bell and Satchel Paige. However, these contracts exhausted team finances, leading to a decline of Dominican baseball until 1950.

Founding teams
In the early 1900s, four Dominican teams formed. These teams still exist today, and form the foundation of Dominican professional baseball:

Tigres del Licey (1907)
Estrellas Orientales (1911)
Leones del Escogido (1921)
Sandino, later renamed Águilas Cibaeñas (1937)

Cultural impact
Baseball was first brought to the Dominican Republic by Cubans fleeing the Ten Years' War. At first, it struggled to gain popularity, being confined mostly to the Cuban exiles, but its popularity grew as more and more native-born Dominicans took it up. The growing popularity of the sport led to the formation of LIDOM. The formation of the new domestic baseball league allowed Dominican players to flourish and public interest to grow. The sport's domestic popularity and the new league increased the bond that many spectators felt with their teams; even today, many Dominicans feel tightly connected to the sport.

Community-level impact

As a cultural icon of the Dominican Republic, baseball holds a strong presence in many parts the country. Surrounded by working class neighborhoods, baseball stadiums in larger Dominican cities are routinely maintained. Owners of big businesses like sugar refineries funded the construction of these fields to benefit from the games. Games in these stadiums attract major crowds and a sense of community can be observed. Like their American counterparts, these "latinized" games exude free-spiritedness, social cohesion, and festivity from the fans and players alike. In the Dominican Republic, baseball players are regaled as sports heroes and function as role models to their fan base. This idolization is covered by the media more so than in the United States.

The Dominican Republic has the largest economy in the Caribbean and Central American region. The country has the fastest growing economy in Latin America, and a growing middle-class population. However income inequality persists in this developing nation, according to statistics in 2016, 30.5 percent of Dominicans lived below the nation's poverty line, while 5.5% of Dominicans were unemployed. With poverty preventing certain segments of the Dominican population a chance to get a higher education, many look up to the success of those who become famous baseball players, and see baseball as an escape from poverty. Because of this, children begin playing organized baseball as early as six years old, and compete with others in leagues with the hopes of being recognized by baseball scouts.

Some argue that the perception of baseball as economic salvation is in reality detrimental to the youth of the Dominican Republic, as it promotes seeking baseball success at all costs, at the expense of pursuing higher education.

American hegemony inside Dominican baseball

After Fidel Castro's revolution in Cuba and the subsequent U.S. blockade, scouts of the majors turned their sights towards the Dominican Republic. Posed with the opportunity to acquire quality talent at a reasonable price, major league teams established "working relationships" with Dominican professional teams. Since the 1950s, all 30 MLB franchises have established baseball training academies in the Dominican Republic which are tasked by their respective teams to condition and prepare young Dominican prospects for a chance at further developing in the United States. Having produced many successful athletes from these academies, these academies undercut the reliance of U.S. teams on Dominican baseball organizations.

Championship history

*Two Dominican teams participated in the Serie del Caribe in 2008

*Championships won before LIDOM (1951)

See also

References

External links
 About Dominican Republic Baseball

Baseball competitions in the Dominican Republic
Baseball leagues in North America
Latin American baseball leagues
Winter baseball leagues
Sports leagues established in 1951
Sports leagues in the Dominican Republic
1951 establishments in the Dominican Republic